Mountsberg Conservation Area is a conservation area near Campbellville, Ontario  widely known for its Raptor Centre. It is owned and operated by the Halton Region Conservation Authority. Kept there are variety of birds, buffalo, horses, and many other animals. Schools can go to the Conservation area to have lessons about birds. The Canadian Pacific Railway's Galt Subdivision crosses through the Mountsberg Reservoir.

The park is named for the village of Mountsberg.

References

External links
 Conservation Halton: Mountsberg Conservation Area
 

Conservation areas in Ontario
Protected areas of the Regional Municipality of Halton